Francesco "Franco" Nones (born 1 February 1941) is an Italian former cross-country skier who competed during the 1960s.

Biography

Nones was  born in Castello-Molina di Fiemme. His best known finish was a gold medal in the 30 km event at the 1968 Winter Olympics in Grenoble, making Nones the first non-Scandinavian (Finland, Norway, and Sweden) and non-Soviet/Russian male to win a Winter Olympic cross-country skiing gold medal.

Nones also earned a bronze in the 4 x 10 km relay at the 1966 FIS Nordic World Ski Championships. He also finished 6th in the 30 km event at those same games.

Achievements
 1963: 3rd, Italian men's championships of cross-country skiing, 15 km
 1964:
 1st, Italian men's championships of cross-country skiing, 30 km
 1st, Italian men's championships of cross-country skiing, 15 km
 1965:
 1st, Italian men's championships of cross-country skiing, 30 km
 1st, Italian men's championships of cross-country skiing, 15 km
 1966:
 1st, Italian men's championships of cross-country skiing, 30 km
 1st, Italian men's championships of cross-country skiing, 15 km
 1967:
 1st, Italian men's championships of cross-country skiing, 50 km
 2nd, Italian men's championships of cross-country skiing, 30 km
 1970:
 1st, Italian men's championships of cross-country skiing, 30 km
 1st, Italian men's championships of cross-country skiing, 15 km
 1971: 1st, Italian men's championships of cross-country skiing, 15 km

Awards
On 7 May 2015, in the presence of the President of Italian National Olympic Committee (CONI), Giovanni Malagò, was inaugurated in the Olympic Park of the Foro Italico in Rome, along Viale delle Olimpiadi, the Walk of Fame of Italian sport, consisting of 100 tiles that chronologically report names of the most representative athletes in the history of Italian sport. On each tile are the name of the sportsman, the sport in which he distinguished himself and the symbol of CONI. One of these tiles is dedicated to Franco Nones.

See also
 Legends of Italian sport - Walk of Fame

References

External links
 
 

1941 births
Living people
Sportspeople from Trentino
Italian male cross-country skiers
Cross-country skiers at the 1964 Winter Olympics
Cross-country skiers at the 1968 Winter Olympics
Cross-country skiers at the 1972 Winter Olympics
Olympic medalists in cross-country skiing
FIS Nordic World Ski Championships medalists in cross-country skiing
Olympic gold medalists for Italy
Medalists at the 1968 Winter Olympics
Olympic cross-country skiers of Italy
Cross-country skiers of Fiamme Gialle